The Ochchuguy-Botuobuya ( or Малая Ботуобуя; , Oççuguy Botuobuya) is a river in the Republic of Sakha in Russia.

Course 
It flows roughly northwards through a wide valley with the larger Ulakhan-Botuobuya running parallel to it further to the west. Finally, it joins river Vilyuy from the right near Khampa village. The river freezes between October and late May.

The main tributaries of the Ochchuguy-Botuobuya are the Irelyakh and the Kharya Yuryakh. The town of Almazny is located at the confluence of the Ochchuguy Botuobuya and the Irelyakh.

See also
List of rivers of Russia

References

External links

 Geography - Yakutia Organized

Rivers of the Sakha Republic